Charlotte Gray is a 2001 drama film directed by Gillian Armstrong. The screenplay was adapted from Sebastian Faulks' 1999 novel Charlotte Gray. It is set in Vichy France during World War II. The film stars Cate Blanchett, James Fleet, Abigail Cruttenden, Rupert Penry-Jones, Michael Gambon and Billy Crudup.

The story is based on the exploits of women in Britain's Special Operations Executive (SOE) who worked with the French resistance in Nazi-occupied France.

The fictional character Charlotte Gray is a composite based on such SOE agents as Pearl Cornioley, Nancy Wake, Odette Sansom and Violette Szabo.

Plot
In 1942, a young Scot, Charlotte Gray, travels by train to London to take a job in a surgery. Richard Cannerley enters her compartment, asking questions about her life and expressing interest that she is fluent in French. He gives Charlotte his business card with the details of a book launch party. There, he introduces Charlotte to some of his acquaintances and asks her to contact him later. Charlotte enjoys a quick wartime romance with Royal Air Force Flight Lieutenant Peter Gregory, whom she met at the party.

Cannerley has recruited Charlotte for the SOE. She is seconded to First Aid Nursing Yeomanry with the rank of Driver. She completes rigorous SOE training. Charlotte learns that Gregory's plane has gone down over occupied France and that he is missing in action. Charlotte signs up for SOE operations in France, partly motivated by her wish to find him.

Charlotte's first mission to France is to deliver radio vacuum tubes. She drops by parachute. She meets her contact in a café, but the contact is arrested by the police in front of her. Julien, Charlotte's main contact in the French Resistance, reassigns her to act as housekeeper to his father, Levade. Levade is hiding two French Jewish boys, André and Jacob, after their parents were deported to a German concentration camp in Nazi-occupied Poland.

Charlotte participates in a Resistance mission: helping to blow up a train carrying Nazi armaments and soldiers. The Nazis bring their own forces and armoured vehicles to the village to crush the Resistance in the area. Charlotte's SOE contact tells her that Gregory died after his aeroplane was shot down.

A French official arrives to work with the Germans to ensure that their quota for deporting Jews is met. Renech, the village schoolmaster, follows Charlotte. He learns that Levade is hiding Jewish children. He threatens Charlotte with reporting the boys to the Nazis unless she agrees to become his "friend". She promises to meet him the following night.

That night, Julien's Resistance group is ambushed by German soldiers, armed with machine guns. All are killed except Julien. Believing Charlotte betrayed them, Julien confronts her the next day at his father's house. Soon afterwards, German soldiers, with Renech and the French official, arrive at Levade's house. They question him about his Jewish ancestry, about which Renech apparently informed him. Renech tells Julien he must betray either his father or the boys (Renech does not care which). Julien announces that his father has a Jewish grandparent and that this means he himself is therefore of Jewish ancestry. The Germans arrest Levade, who understands Julien, who does not qualify for deportation because he is only  Jewish, acted to protect the boys.

Renech betrays the boys anyway. The Germans arrive at the boys' new hiding place before Charlotte can get there and capture them. Julien lies in wait for Renech in his apartment and shoots him dead. Julien leaves for southern France, perhaps to escape to fight elsewhere. Charlotte refuses to go with him, saying that she still has duties to fulfil. Charlotte simply smiles when he says that he does not even know her real name.

Evading French police, Charlotte rushes to Levade's house where she hurriedly types a letter and takes it to the railway station where Jews are being loaded into cattle cars. Hearing the boys and Levade, Charlotte pushes the letter between the boards of their car. Levade reads it aloud to the boys: it purports to be a letter from their parents, encouraging them to care for one another, to eat well, to survive and reminding them of their parents' love. Although the film suggests that Levade and the Jewish boys are doomed, Faulks's novel states explicitly that they die in a concentration camp.

Sometime later, Charlotte leaves France and returns to London. Peter Gregory, who in fact survived his aeroplane crash and has been in hiding in France, contacts her, wanting to resume their romance. Charlotte explains that she grieved for him and cannot go back to their romantic relationship. After the war, Charlotte returns to Julien at what was formerly his father's home. For the first time, she tells him her real name is Charlotte Gray.

Cast
Cate Blanchett as Charlotte Gray
James Fleet as Richard Cannerley
Abigail Cruttenden as Daisy
Rupert Penry-Jones as Peter Gregory
Billy Crudup as Julien Levade
Michael Gambon as Monsieur Levade
Lewis Crutch as Andre 
Matthew Plato as Jacob 
Anton Lesser as Monsieur Renech
Ron Cook as Mirabel
Helen McCrory as Françoise
David Birkin as Jean-Paul
John Bennett as Gerard 
Wolf Kahler as Oberleutnant Lindermann
Jack Shepherd as Paul Pichon

Production
Filming took place between February and May 2001. Exteriors were filmed on location at Saint-Antonin-Noble-Val, in the French department of Tarn-et-Garonne, as well as in England, Scotland and at Pinewood Studios.

Reception
Charlotte Gray received negative reviews from critics. It holds a 33% rating on Rotten Tomatoes based on 89 reviews. The critics' consensus said, "A dull adaptation of Sebastian Faulk's novel despite gorgeous cinematography and Cate Blanchett's best efforts". Metacritic gave the film a score of 48 based on 28 reviews.

Charlotte Gray grossed AUD 4,188,497 at the box office in Australia, USD 1,886,566 in the United Kingdom and Ireland, and only USD 741,394 in the United States, where it had a very limited release (widest release was 52 cinemas).

References

External links
Official site

2001 films
2001 romantic drama films
2000s war drama films
Australian romantic drama films
Australian war drama films
British romantic drama films
British war drama films
2000s English-language films
English-language German films
Films about the French Resistance
Films based on British novels
Films directed by Gillian Armstrong
Films scored by Stephen Warbeck
Films shot at Pinewood Studios
Film4 Productions films
German war drama films
German romantic drama films
2000s British films
2000s German films